A list of notable politicians of the German Left Party:

A
 Doris Achelwilm
 Hans-Henning Adler
 Wolfram Adolphi
Ali Al-Dailami
 Wolfgang Albers
 Elke Altmann
 Elmar Altvater
 Kersten Artus
 Hüseyin Kenan Aydın

B
 Dietmar Bartsch
 Theodor Bergmann
 Gerhard Besier
 Karin Binder
 Lothar Bisky
 Carola Bluhm
 Heidrun Bluhm
 Julia Bonk
 André Brie
 Christine Buchholz
 Eva Bulling-Schröter
 Martina Bunge

C
 Roland Claus

D
 Sevim Dağdelen
Özlem Demirel

E
 Dagmar Enkelmann
 Cornelia Ernst
 Klaus Ernst

F
 Heinrich Fink

G
 Erwin Geschonneck
Christian Görke
 Angelika Gramkow
Ates Gürpinar
 Gregor Gysi

H
 André Hahn
 Thomas Händel
 Wolfgang Fritz Haug
 Lutz Heilmann
Susanne Hennig-Wellsow
 Kurt Herzog
 Dora Heyenn
 Inge Höger
 Helmut Holter

J
 Ulla Jelpke
 Luc Jochimsen

K
 Kerstin Kaiser
 Sylvia-Yvonne Kaufmann
 Gisela Kessler
 Katja Kipping
 Jürgen Klute
 Jan Korte

L
 Oskar Lafontaine
Ina Latendorf
 Klaus Lederer
Christian Leye
 Gesine Lötzsch

M
 Helmuth Markov
 Ulrich Maurer
 Hans Modrow
 Irene Müller

N
 Thomas Nord

O
 Willi van Ooyen

P
 Norman Paech
 Petra Pau
 Harald Petzold 
 Tobias Pflüger
 Peter Porsch

R
Bodo Ramelow
Heidi Reichinnek
 Bernd Riexinger

S
 Rüdiger Sagel
 Carsten Schatz
 Katina Schubert
 Gerlinde Stobrawa

T
 Anita Tack
 Wilfried Telkämper
 Axel Troost

U
 Feleknas Uca

W
 Sahra Wagenknecht
 Heike Werner
 Sabine Wils
Janine Wissler
 Harald Wolf
 Jörn Wunderlich

Z
 Gabi Zimmer
 Wolfgang Zimmermann

 
Left